Rheineck railway station is a railway station that serves the municipality of Rheineck, in the canton of St. Gallen, Switzerland. The station is located on the eastern edge of Rheineck village centre, with the A1 motorway, the Alter Rhein river channel and then the border with Austria flanking the opposite side of the station.

The station is an intermediate stop on the St. Margrethen–Rorschach railway line, and is the lower terminus of the Rheineck–Walzenhausen mountain railway. It is served by St. Gallen S-Bahn services S2, S4, and S5, which link Rheineck to the city of St. Gallen and other local towns, and by service S26, which shuttles up to Walzenhausen. The S2, S4, and S5 each run hourly, providing three trains per hour to and from St. Gallen, whilst the S26 operates one or two return journeys per hour, depending on the time of day.

Rheineck is also the easterly end of the Swiss shipping services on Lake Constance, and the town's landing stages are located on the Alter Rhein channel. The landing stages are linked to the station by a pedestrian subway under the A1 motorway. Local bus services operate from a bus station adjacent to the station building.

The station has two side platforms, on either side of the twin track main line. The station building abuts the western platform, and is linked to the eastern platform by a pedestrian subway. The Rheineck–Walzenhausen line starts from its own platform, which is actually located on the western mainline platform.

Gallery

References

External links
 
 

Railway stations in the canton of St. Gallen
Swiss Federal Railways stations